David Alan Adkisson (July 22, 1958 – February 10, 1984) was an American professional wrestler, better known by the ring name David Von Erich. A member of the Von Erich Family, Von Erich is best known for his appearances with World Class Championship Wrestling, the Dallas, Texas-based professional wrestling promotion owned by his father, Fritz Von Erich. Von Erich was inducted into the WWE Hall of Fame in 2009.

Early life 
David was named after his mother Doris' brother David, who had died only months before David Von Erich was born in 1958. Doris' brother David (real name Eugene David Smith) had died of a brain tumor at 14.

David, along with brothers Kevin and Kerry, loved to hunt and fish with their father; Fritz. Hunting on the Von Erich ranch was quite an event. Many of their relatives and friends would join in and sometimes the hunting group would be 20 or more. WCCW Referee David Manning and WCCW Announcer Bill Mercer were quite often among the group.
David's first love in life was raising horses, which turned out to be very profitable for him. He raised and sold quarter horses and horses for show and made his own fortune that way, apart from the family business of wrestling.

Adkisson was a high school basketball star and a football player at Lake Dallas High School. He won a scholarship to North Texas State University to play basketball and football. David dropped out to pursue a wrestling career that he had started in June 1977, adopting the name David Von Erich.

Professional wrestling career

Early career (1977–1982)
He was considered a breakout star of his family, as his fiery temper produced memorable interviews. His first major match was on August 15, 1977, when he wrestled NWA World Heavyweight Champion Harley Race to a 30-minute draw. David made his first appearance in Missouri in early 1979 and was an instant hit with the fans and the promoters. Due to his popularity at the time, on May 27, 1979, David wrestled NWA champion Race in Missouri in a non-title match and defeated him with the Iron Claw.

In November 1979, David made his first and only appearance in the World Wrestling Federation (WWF), competing on a card against Davey O'Hannon at Madison Square Garden. In late 1981, David left Texas and struck out on his own, heading to Florida and competing as a heel. In Florida, David was managed by J. J. Dillon and was in the same stable as Kendo Nagasaki and Jimmy Garvin. David's mentor in Florida was Dory Funk, Jr. and during that time David teamed with Dory or his brother Terry Funk in addition to singles competition. Memorable opponents included Barry Windham, Mr. Wrestling II, Eric Embry, Sweet Brown Sugar, and Butch Reed. By July 1982, David was back in Texas.

Feud with Gorgeous Jimmy Garvin (1983)
During his stay in Florida, David met and became great friends with Jimmy Garvin, convincing Garvin to come to World Class Championship Wrestling (WCCW) in Texas in early 1983 and they created an angle for a feud between them, which culminated with David winning the held-up NWA Texas Heavyweight Championship at The Tarrant County Convention Center on July 4, 1983.  As a result of David's victory, Garvin and his valet Sunshine were forced to serve as David's valets for a day, with the results of the day being broadcast on the WCCW weekly show. The whole angle was conceived by David and Jimmy. They traded the Texas title back and forth several times, then that belt was held up several times and when the feud reached its climax on July 4, 1983; it was time for both men to move on to the next part in their career (David continuing the Von Erich feud with The Freebirds and Garvin starting a feud with Chris Adams).

Feud with The Freebirds (1982–1984) 
In the fall of 1982, David was also working behind the scenes in WCCW and helped create several angles. He invited the Fabulous Freebirds to come to WCCW. Michael Hayes made his debut at the Sportatorium on Saturday, October 16, 1982, and Terry Gordy made his debut at the Sportatorium two weeks later, on October 30, 1982. Buddy Roberts did not show up. The Freebirds were initially booked as faces in the run-up to the Christmas spectacular "Wrestling Star Wars" card at Reunion Arena on December 25, 1982.

In the final match to crown the first-ever Six-Man Champions, David took Buddy Roberts' place in the Freebirds against Tom Sharpe, Mike Sharpe & Ben Steel. It was David who won that match and the title, but in a ringside interview right after the bout, David gave his third of the title to Buddy Roberts. Later that evening, David's brother Kerry battled NWA World Champion Ric Flair in a Steel Cage with Michael Hayes and David Manning as the referees. During the match, Hayes knocked out Flair and attempted to hand the pin (and World Title) to Von Erich, but turned on Kerry when he refused the tainted victory and as Kerry tried to leave the cage, Gordy slammed the cage door on Kerry's head. Thus the Von Erich/Freebird feud was born.

David took part in many matches against the Freebirds in 1983 and early 1984. Notable bouts include David vs Terry Gordy in a Handcuff Match on April 1, 1983, at "Wrestling Star Wars", David, Kevin & Kerry defeating the Freebirds on July 4, 1983, in Ft. Worth at "Star Wars" and what would be David's next-to-last match was against Terry Gordy on February 3, 1984. On the same day, David defeated Hayes to win the NWA United National Championship, his last title ever. This title is now part of All Japan Pro Wrestling's Triple Crown Heavyweight Championship.

Feud with Ric Flair (1983–1984) 

David won the NWA Missouri Heavyweight Championship from Ric Flair on September 16, 1983, holding the championship until losing it to Harley Race on January 6, 1984. Many within the industry believe that David's reign with the belt was his final step to winning the NWA World Heavyweight Championship, as the NWA Championship Committee supposedly voted in January 1984 for David to win it from Ric Flair in March or April of that year. An angle between David and Ric Flair was started when David battled Flair at Reunion Arena on December 25, 1983, and Flair retained the NWA World Championship. Immediately afterward, on December 31, 1983, on the NWA television broadcast, Ric Flair did an interview where he commented on how Mike Von Erich was not a good wrestler and he could beat Mike in 60 seconds with one hand tied behind his back.

In an interview in Ft. Worth on January 9, 1984, David did possibly his most intense interview ever, telling Flair that he had heard Flair's comments about Mike and that he had a proposition. Mike would wrestle Flair in a "10 Minute Challenge Match" and if Flair beat Mike in that 10 minutes, David would never again ask for another shot at the NWA World title, but if Flair did not beat Mike in those 10 minutes, David would get to name the place, the time and every stipulation for his match against Ric Flair. The "10 Minute Challenge match" between Ric Flair and Mike Von Erich was held at WCCW Wrestling Star Wars at the Tarrant County Convention Center in Ft. Worth, Texas, on January 30, 1984. Flair was unable to pin Mike in the 10 minutes and as a result, David won the challenge. A week later on February 6, 1984, in Ft. Worth, in what would turn out to be his last interview, David Von Erich expressed his happiness over Mike lasting 10 minutes with Ric Flair and said that now he (David) would get to name every single stipulation in David's return match with Flair. The big match was to be held sometime in about April 1984, after David was to return to Texas at the end of February and he and Flair would have a chance to build the match up even more. His last match was defeating Kamala by DQ in Ardmore, Oklahoma on February 7.

Personal life 
David's first marriage was with Candy L. McLeod. The couple were wed on June 26, 1978, in Denton, Texas. Together they had a daughter, Natosha Zoeanna Adkisson (October 19, 1978 – December 29 1978). Natosha died of SIDS at 13 weeks old. Shortly after, David separated from his wife and they were officially divorced on July 12, 1979. David married for the second time on June 8, 1982, to Patricia A. Matter, known as Tricia. The couple remained married until David's death. Tricia was interviewed for the June 1984 edition of The Wrestler magazine, which was a tribute to David. She spoke of how she loved the fans, and thanked them for their support. Tricia has remained out of the public eye since that interview.

Death 
Von Erich died during a tour with All Japan Pro Wrestling on February 10, 1984, before defending the United National championship belt he had won in Texas seven days earlier. One theory of his death is that it was a painkiller overdose, perhaps hydrocodone. Ric Flair mentions in his autobiography that Bruiser Brody (Von Erich's long-time friend) removed the evidence. The Von Erichs, however, claimed it was caused by ruptured intestines resulting from acute enteritis, which is the documented cause of death listed on the Consular Report of Death provided by the U.S. embassy in Japan. In the documentary Heroes of World Class: The Story of the Von Erichs and The Triumph and Tragedy of World Class Championship Wrestling, Kevin Von Erich and former referee David Manning both attested to a heart attack theory. According to friend and former promoter Wild Bill Irwin, David is believed to have suffered from bulimia, which Irwin alludes to in a 2017 Wrestling Shoot Podcast on the "Booking The Territory" YouTube channel.

Championships and accomplishments
All Japan Pro Wrestling
All Asia Tag Team Championship (1 time) – with Kevin Von Erich
Championship Wrestling from Florida
NWA Florida Television Championship (1 time)
NWA North American Tag Team Championship (Florida version) (1 time) – with Dory Funk, Jr.
NWA Southern Heavyweight Championship (Florida version) (1 time)
NWA Big Time Wrestling / World Class Championship Wrestling
NWA American Tag Team Championship (1 time) – with Kevin Von Erich
NWA Texas Heavyweight Championship (8 times)
NWA Texas Tag Team Championship (2 times) – with Kevin Von Erich
NWA United National Championship (1 time)
NWA World Six-Man Tag Team Championship (Texas version) (2 times) – with Kevin Von Erich and Kerry Von Erich
NWA World Tag Team Championship (1 time) – with Kevin Von Erich
NWA Western States Sports
NWA Western States Tag Team Championship (1 time) - with Kevin Von Erich
Pro Wrestling Illustrated
Stanley Weston Award (1984)
PWI ranked him #58 of the top 500 singles wrestlers of the "PWI Years" in 2003
PWI ranked him #23 of the top 100 tag teams of the "PWI Years" with Mike, Kevin, and Kerry Von Erich in 2003
St. Louis Wrestling Club
NWA Missouri Heavyweight Championship (1 time)
St. Louis Wrestling Hall of Fame
Class of 2016
World Wrestling Entertainment
WWE Hall of Fame (Class of 2009)

See also 

 Von Erich Family
 List of premature professional wrestling deaths

References

External links 
 
 
 

1958 births
1984 deaths
20th-century professional wrestlers
American male professional wrestlers
Professional wrestlers from Texas
Sportspeople from Dallas
Von Erich family
WWE Hall of Fame inductees
People from Lake Dallas, Texas
People from Denton County, Texas
All Asia Tag Team Champions
NWA Florida Television Champions
NWA North American Tag Team Champions (Florida version)
NWA Southern Heavyweight Champions (Florida version)
NWA United National Champions